Kalili may refer to:

John Kalili (–1855) was a judge and politician in the Kingdom of Hawaii.
Hamana Kalili (1882–1958) was a Hawaiian fisherman who is popularly credited as being the originator of the Shaka sign.
Maiola Kalili (1909–1972), Olympic swimmer and older brother of Manuella Kalili. 
Manuella Kalili (1912–?), Olympic swimmer and younger brother of Maiola Kalili.